Unit One may refer to:

Unit One, a British grouping of Modernist artists founded by Paul Nash, active from 1933 to 1935
Rejseholdet, international title Unit One, a Danish television crime series